Obrad was a Serbian nobleman that served king Stefan Vladislav (r. 1234–43), with the title of veliki tepčija. He is the oldest veliki tepčija known by name. The title-holder took care of the royal estates. He is mentioned in the 1230s, as a "great lord" (veliki gospodin). He had a menologion written, which later came into the possession of Radoslava ("the wife of the tepčija", presumably veliki tepčija Mišljen). The work includes songs to St. Sava. He seems to have not belonged to the royal family.

References

Sources

13th-century Serbian nobility
People of the Kingdom of Serbia (medieval)
13th-century deaths
12th-century births
Tepčija
Medieval Serbian magnates